Pashenino is a rural locality (a village) in Arkhangelskoye Rural Settlement, Sokolsky District, Vologda Oblast, Russia. The population was 27 as of 2002.

Geography 
Pashenino is located 21 km northwest of Sokol (the district's administrative centre) by road. Semenkovo is the nearest rural locality.

References 

Rural localities in Sokolsky District, Vologda Oblast